Gerardo Maximiliano Cortázar Lara (born 2 November 1966) is a Mexican politician affiliated with the PAN. As of 2013 he has served as Deputy of the LXII Legislature of the Mexican Congress representing the Federal District. He also has served as Media Secretary of the PAN during Vicente Fox's government.

References

1966 births
Living people
People from Mexico City
National Action Party (Mexico) politicians
21st-century Mexican politicians
Deputies of the LXII Legislature of Mexico
Members of the Chamber of Deputies (Mexico) for Mexico City